Jean de la Flèche, also known as Jean de Beaugency, Seigneur de la Flèche (c. 1030  – c. 1097) was an 11th-century French nobleman. He was the youngest son of Lancelin I de Beaugency (possible son of Landry Sore de Beaugency (died 1042)) and Adelberg de Maine and was born about 1030 in La Flèche, Sarthe. His father was Seigneur (lord) de Beaugency and they were powerful Barons of Beaugency until the 13th century.

The family of de la Flèche built the original wooden fort, Château de Beaugency, which was later replaced by a stone castle.

The massive keep still survives as a ruined shell. A later mansion was built on the grounds of the castle.
Jean de la Flèche became the first Seigneur of La Flèche where he held its original castle (the current one is from the 15th century). In 1059, Jean married Paula of Maine, daughter of Herbert I, Count of Maine. Jean and Paula were the parents of Elias I, Count of Maine, who married Mathilde de Château-du-Loir, and the great-grandparents of Geoffrey Plantagenet, Count of Anjou, father of Henry II of England.

It is also understood that the surname Fletcher came from Jean de la Fleche, where the name was first recorded in Yorkshire, where he was given lands by William the Conqueror.

References

1030 births
1090s deaths
Year of birth uncertain
Year of death uncertain
Date of birth unknown
Date of death unknown
11th-century French people
French suo jure nobility
French nobility